"The Big Music" is a song from Scottish-Irish folk rock band The Waterboys, which was released in 1984 as the lead single from their second studio album A Pagan Place. The song was written and produced by Mike Scott.

The name "Big Music" was adopted by some commentators as a description of the early Waterboys' sound, and is still used to refer to the musical style of their first three albums.

Writing
Scott wrote "The Big Music" while living at Aldridge Road Villas, Notting Hill, West London. In a 1984 interview with New Musical Express, Scott said of the song, "It's really difficult to describe something that there's no words for. It's not about music, it's more like a religious thing. And it's a very serious song." He added in a 1985 interview with the magazine, "There are numerous lines in that song that illustrate in depth what the Big Music is and what I'm meaning. I worked hard on that lyric over a considerable period of time to say exactly what I intended."

Recording
"The Big Music" was recorded at Rockfield and Farmyard Studios during the Autumn of 1983. The song's two lead and two rhythm guitar parts were performed by Scott on his Danelectro "Bellzouki" 12-string guitar. The song features Eddi Reader on backing vocals, during the early phase of her career when she was working as a session vocalist in London.

In 2015, Scott recalled of the vision for the song's recording, "Most of the songs I did at that time I produced myself like 'The Big Music'. I had written that and I had imagined all the brass lines and backing vocals. I figured it all in my head first and then just went in the studio and made it."

Music video
The song's music video was directed by John Mills and shot at the Lake District in March 1984. Scott was later critical of the video in his autobiography, "The concept made me cringe - bigness, outdoors, mountains, awful clichés of the time, and not what my song was about. I knew it was gonna be bad but it was out of my hands, I couldn't control it. I told [Island Records] not to use the video, and miraculously it was mostly buried till the YouTube age."

Critical reception
On its release, Charles Shaar Murray of New Musical Express considered the song "quite an epic" and added, "Here Scott recounts an experience of being carried away with such visionary passion that he and his admirable sax player almost carry the listener right along." Debbi Voller of Number One described the song as a "full bodied, Big Country kind of sound". Jerry Smith of Music Week wrote, "A big production for this slow, bluesy song with a wonderful sax line and a tortured vocal, backed up with a slow building horn section." He considered the song to be "in a similar vein" to Wah!'s 1982 hit "The Story of the Blues" and felt "with enough exposure it could be as big a hit". Dave Henderson of Sounds praised the song as "rousing stuff" and noted the "fantastically enormous sound" which he felt sounded like "at least 300 people playing on it".

In a review of A Pagan Place, Mike Daly of The Age noted the song "fashions a spectacular Hadrian's Wall of sound around the slow, soulful melody". Diana Valois of The Morning Call considered the song "joyfully proud, creating exhilarating and intoxicating rushes not unlike Springsteen's 'Night'". Tom Harrison of The Province felt it "approximately describes the magnitude of the LP's eight tracks" and added "there is nothing small about the ambitions of Mike Scott". In a 2017 retrospective on the "best of Mike Scott", Tom Doyle of Q included "The Big Music" as one of ten tracks on the list and described it as a "yearning rocker".

Live performances
"The Big Music" was performed as part of the earliest Waterboys concerts from February 1984, but was dropped from the set in April. In a summer 1984 interview with New Musical Express, Scott said of his reluctance to perform the song live, "We don't do that live. There's no way I can sing it. It's too big! I can't get my emotions round that in a live context. 'Big Music' describes a state of mind that doesn't apply most of the time. If I went on stage after a day full of epiphanies I could sing [it]. But if I can't turn it on I won't do it."

The song returned as a regular feature to the setlist from October 1984, and the band continued to perform it throughout 1985 and 1986. A 1985 performance of the song at London's Town & Country Club featured backing vocals from Sinéad O'Connor in her first UK live appearance. Scott frequently performed the song on the 1995–96 tour promoting his debut solo album Bring 'Em All In.

Formats

Personnel
The Big Music
 Mike Scott – vocals, guitar
 Eddi Reader – backing vocals
 Karl Wallinger – piano
 Anthony Thistlethwaite – saxophone, bass
 Roddy Lorimer – trumpet
 Kevin Wilkinson – drums

Production
 Mike Scott – producer (all tracks)
 Ted Sharp – engineer on "The Big Music"
 Steven W. Tayler – engineer on "The Big Music" and "The Earth Only Endures"
 Jim Preen – engineer on "Bury My Heart"

Charts

References

The Waterboys songs
1984 songs
1984 singles
Songs written by Mike Scott (musician)
Song recordings produced by Mike Scott (musician)
Ensign Records singles
Island Records singles